Luís Filipe Ângelo Rodrigues Fernandes (born 14 June 1979), known as Luís Filipe, is a Portuguese former professional footballer who played mainly as a defender but also as a midfielder, always on the right side.

He amassed Primeira Liga totals of 269 games and 14 goals over 16 seasons, representing in the competition Académica, Braga (two spells), Sporting CP, União de Leiria, Marítimo, Benfica, Vitória de Guimarães and Olhanense.

Club career
Born in Cantanhede, Coimbra District, Luís Filipe started playing professionally as a right winger with Académica de Coimbra, and had a small abroad stint with Spain's Atlético Madrid, spent entirely with the reserves. Unsettled, he moved to S.C. Braga, where he blossomed as a Primeira Liga player.

Luís Filipe's development led to a 2001 transfer to Sporting CP. Opportunities were scarce, and he subsequently reconverted to right-back in the molds of Miguel, upon his loan with U.D. Leiria. On 6 August 2003, he scored the first-ever goal at the new Estádio José Alvalade in a 3–1 friendly win against Manchester United.

In the 2004–05 season, Luís Filipe represented C.S. Marítimo. Subsequently, he returned to Braga.

Luís Filipe signed a four-year deal with S.L. Benfica for a €500.000 fee in early August 2007, with also right-back João Pereira going the other way. After one unsuccessful year in Lisbon, he was deemed surplus to requirements by new coach Quique Sánchez Flores, moving alongside Nuno Assis to UEFA Champions League challenger Vitória S.C. in Guimarães, on loan (Assis permanently); the Minho club retained the option to buy the player at the end of the campaign, but it was not activated.

In 2009–10, as Benfica won the league, Luís Filipe's output consisted of 25 minutes in the 1–0 home victory over FC Porto. As the team reached the last eight in the UEFA Europa League, he added a further two appearances.

Luís Filipe played three league games in the 2010–11 season – one win, one draw and one loss– with manager Jorge Jesus resting several starters in rounds which brought a Europa League fixture the following week, as the side fared better in that competition and reached the semi-finals. In mid-May 2011, he left the club as his contract expired and was not renewed. Two months later, he signed for S.C. Olhanense in the same league.

Personal life
After retiring, Luís Filipe began working in agriculture, owning a farm in Vilamoura that specialised in the growing of raspberries.

Honours
Sporting CP
Primeira Liga: 2001–02
Taça de Portugal: 2001–02

Benfica
Primeira Liga: 2009–10
Taça da Liga: 2010–11

References

External links

1979 births
Living people
People from Cantanhede, Portugal
Sportspeople from Coimbra District
Portuguese footballers
Association football defenders
Association football midfielders
Primeira Liga players
Segunda Divisão players
Associação Académica de Coimbra – O.A.F. players
S.C. Braga players
S.C. Braga B players
Sporting CP footballers
Sporting CP B players
U.D. Leiria players
C.S. Marítimo players
S.L. Benfica footballers
Vitória S.C. players
S.C. Olhanense players
Atlético Madrid B players
Portugal youth international footballers
Portugal under-21 international footballers
Portugal B international footballers
Portuguese expatriate footballers
Expatriate footballers in Spain
Portuguese expatriate sportspeople in Spain